2005 World Masters Athletics Championships is the sixteenth in a series of World Masters Athletics Outdoor Championships
that took place in San Sebastián, Spain from 22 August to 3 September 2005.

The main venue was Anoeta Stadium,

which had its running track removed after renovations in 2017.

Some stadia events were held at the adjacent Miniestadio de Anoeta within the same sports complex.
Non-stadia venues included Estadio Daniel Hernani (Pista de Hernani) for throwing events,

and LaSarte Racetrack (Donostia Hippodrome) for Cross Country.

This Championships was organized by World Masters Athletics (WMA) in coordination with a Local Organising Committee (LOC).
The WMA is the global governing body of the sport of athletics for athletes 35 years of age or older, setting rules for masters athletics competition.

The starting age had been 35 years for women and 40 years for men in previous editions in this series, but the men minimum age was reduced to 35 at the General Assembly of the 2003 Championships.

In addition to a full range of track and field events,

non-stadia events included 8K Cross Country, 10K Race Walk (women), 20K Race Walk (men), and Marathon.

Results
Official daily results are archived at conersys.com.

Past Championships results are archived at WMA.

Additional archives are available from Masters Athletics,

from British Masters Athletic Federation

in html, and from Museum of Masters Track & Field

in html and as a National Masters News pdf newsletter.

Several masters world records were set at this Championships. World records for 2005 are from the list of World Records in the National Masters News newsletter unless otherwise noted. A highlight of the competitions was Wolfgang Knabe defeating Willie Banks in the Triple Jump.

Women

Men

References

External links

World Masters Athletics Championships
World Masters Athletics Championships
International athletics competitions hosted by Spain
2005
Masters athletics (track and field) records